John Bransford may refer to:

 John D. Bransford (1943–2022), American psychologist and educationist
 John M. Bransford (1901–1967), member of the Arkansas House of Representatives, 1931–1935 and 1937–1941
 John S. Bransford (1856–1944), mayor of Salt Lake City, Utah, 1907–11